Harold Delos Babcock (January 24, 1882 – April 8, 1968) was an American astronomer and the father of Horace W. Babcock. He was of English and German ancestry. He was born in Edgerton, Wisconsin, before completing high school in Los Angeles and was accepted to the University of California, Berkeley in 1901. He worked at the Mount Wilson Observatory from 1907 until 1948. He specialized in solar spectroscopy and precisely mapped the distribution of magnetic fields over the Sun's surface, working alongside his son. In 1953 he won the Bruce Medal. Babcock died of a heart attack in Pasadena, California at age 86.

The crater Babcock on the Moon is named after him, as is asteroid 3167 Babcock (jointly named after him and his son).

References

External links
National Academy of Sciences Biographical Memoir

Obituaries
 Obs 88 (1968) 174 (one paragraph)
 QJRAS 10 (1969) 68

1882 births
1968 deaths
University of California, Berkeley alumni
People from Edgerton, Wisconsin
20th-century American astronomers